Meloneras is a tourist town on the south coast of the island of Gran Canaria, Canary Islands, part of the town of Maspalomas in the municipality of San Bartolomé de Tirajana.

It is mostly characterised by tourist hotels and other accommodation. Its most prominent landmark is the Faro de Maspalomas, next to Maspalomas Beach and the Maspalomas Dunes.

Some of the luxury hotel complexes in Meloneras display are notable for their Canarian Spanish Colonial Revival style, partly derived from de la Torre's Hotel Santa Catalina (1890) in Las Palmas.

References

Populated places in Gran Canaria
Tourism in Spain